Duncan McDougall may refer to:

Duncan McDougall (fur trader) (died 1818)
Duncan McDougall (rower) (born 1959), British rower

See also
Duncan MacDougall (disambiguation)